Shadbad-e Mashayekh (also Romanized as Shādbād-e Mashāyekh; also known as Panbeh Shalvār, Pina Shalvar, Pīneh Shalvār, Shādābād-e Mashāyekh, and Shāh Ābād-e-Mashāyekh) is a village in Meydan Chay Rural District, in the Central District of Tabriz County, East Azerbaijan Province, Iran. At the 2006 census, its population was 4,317, in 1,086 families.

References 

Populated places in Tabriz County